Scott McBride (born 19 September 1989) is a Scottish professional footballer who last played for Lowland League club Kelty Hearts. Scott has moved from playing the game of football to becoming a football coach and has taken up the reigns at former club East Fife as their Head Coach of the Under 20s squad that play their trade in Scottish Development lowland leagues in Scotland.

He began his career at Dunfermline, spending time on loan at Arbroath and Cowdenbeath. He then joined Cowdenbeath permanently and from there had spells with Raith Rovers, East Fife, Arbroath and Albion Rovers.

Career
Born in Kirkcaldy, McBride started his career with Dunfermline Athletic. He made his début in September 2007, against Scottish Premier League opponents Heart of Midlothian in the Scottish League Cup. In February 2008, McBride signed on loan with Scottish Third Division side Arbroath until the end of the 2007–08 season.

In July 2009, McBride was loaned out to Cowdenbeath. and on 29 January 2010, made the move permanent. On 9 June 2010, McBride signed for Raith Rovers on a full-time contract. On 16 May 2012, Raith announced he was among a list of players being given a free transfer. On 7 July 2012, McBride signed for East Fife. On 18 June 2013, he signed on for a second season with the Fife club. On 21 May 2014, he was named as one of the players to have left East Fife at the end of the season.

In June 2014, McBride signed for Arbroath for a second time. After one season with Arbroath, McBride signed with newly promoted Scottish League One side Albion Rovers in June 2015. He made his debut against Peterhead and scored his first goal against Stranraer. McBride spent two seasons with the Cliftonhill club before signed for Forfar Athletic on 3 June 2017.

McBride signed for Kelty Hearts in January 2019 after his second spell with East Fife.

Career statistics

References

External links

Living people
1989 births
Scottish footballers
Dunfermline Athletic F.C. players
Arbroath F.C. players
Cowdenbeath F.C. players
Raith Rovers F.C. players
East Fife F.C. players
Albion Rovers F.C. players
Forfar Athletic F.C. players
Association football midfielders
Footballers from Kirkcaldy
Scottish Football League players
Scottish Professional Football League players
Kelty Hearts F.C. players